Taylor Booth may refer to:

 Taylor Booth (mathematician) (1933–1986), American mathematician
 Taylor Booth (soccer) (born 2001), American soccer player